The Cottonwood Mountains range is found in Death Valley National Park in Inyo County, California, U.S.

The range lies just to the northwest of the Panamint Mountains at the top of Death Valley, and run in a north–south direction.

Tin Mountain, at the northern end of the range, reaches an elevation of 2,729 meters. At the southern end of the range is Towne Pass, at 1,511 meters. The Last Chance Range is to the east.

See also
Racetrack Playa
Ubehebe Crater
Geology of the Death Valley area

There is another small range with the same name east of Indio, California.

References

Death Valley
Mountain ranges of the Mojave Desert
Mountain ranges of Inyo County, California
Death Valley National Park